Carl Edward Richard Cort (born 1 November 1977) is a former professional footballer who played as a forward.

He played for Wimbledon, Lincoln City, Newcastle United, Wolverhampton Wanderers, Leicester City, Spanish club UD Marbella and Norwich City, Brentford, and North American Soccer League side Tampa Bay Rowdies.

Born in England, he represented the Guyana national team at international level.

Career

Wimbledon
Cort, born in London of Guyanese descent, began his career with Wimbledon as a teenager. He went on a one-month loan to Lincoln City in February 1997, and when he came back to the Dons he made his debut as a substitute against Aston Villa on 9 April 1997. He had to wait until the start of the next season to make his second appearance; on 13 September 1997 Cort started away against Newcastle United and scored in the first minute as Wimbledon went on to win 3–1. Three days later he scored twice against Millwall in the League Cup. A place in the England under-21s soon followed. Another highlight at Wimbledon was scoring a hat trick against Sunderland in the League Cup in October 1999.

Newcastle United
Newcastle boss Bobby Robson paid £7 million to sign Cort on a five-year contract in the summer of 2000, seeing off competition from Tottenham Hotspur and Leicester City. After making his debut against Manchester United at Old Trafford, he scored on his Newcastle home debut, against Derby County, but struggled with hamstring problems and underwent surgery after only a few appearances for his new club. He did eventually return to the first team in March 2001, and went on to score five goals in ten appearances before the season ended.

In the 2001–02 season, injury ruined his season again. Cort was ruled out until March due to injuries to his ankle and knee. He travelled to the United States for specialist treatment and was treated by the same surgeon who treated future teammate Joleon Lescott. The injuries appeared to take their toll, and Cort struggled to make an impact in the Premier League. His only league appearance in the 2002–03 season was a four-minute cameo as a substitute at West Ham.

Wolverhampton Wanderers
Having recovered from injury, he moved to Wolverhampton Wanderers for £2 million during January 2004. He scored five goals for his new club that season but could not prevent relegation from the top flight. In the 2004–05 season, his form improved and he scored 16 goals in 40 appearances. Wolves had an indifferent season in 2005–06. Cort began the season well, scoring nine goals in the first 11 matches. Injury interrupted his season again, and by the end of May, Cort had added only two more to his tally, totalling 11 goals in 24 appearances. After the following campaign was again plagued by injury, he was released by Wolves in May 2007.

Leicester City
On 8 June 2007, Cort signed a two-year contract with Leicester City. He scored his only goal for the club in a 4–3 League Cup defeat to Chelsea on 31 October. Although it won Leicester City's Goal of the Month for October, Cort failed to score a single league goal, and he was transfer listed on 23 December. He was released by the club by mutual consent on 11 January.

Marbella
On 30 January 2008, Cort joined Spanish club UD Marbella, who were then playing in the Segunda División B.

Norwich City
Cort returned to England when he signed for Norwich City on 9 December 2008 until the end of the 2008–09 season. He made his debut for Norwich against Reading at the Madejski Stadium and scored his first goal for the club in a 3–3 draw at Wolves on 3 February 2009. This was his first league goal since March 2006, when he netted for Wolves in a Championship fixture at Hull City. Following Norwich's relegation to League One Cort left the club after having his contract terminated by mutual consent.

Brentford
After leaving Norwich, Cort went on trial with Wycombe Wanderers but was not offered a contract. He later went on to sign for Brentford on a five-month deal, which was then extended to the end of the season. He scored his first goal for Brentford against Swindon Town on 3 October 2009 and added another 5 goals making it 6 goals in 26 appearances. In June 2010, Cort signed a new one-year contract at Brentford, but was later released in January 2011.

AFC Wimbledon
Cort had been training with the AFC Wimbledon reserve/development squad. It was reported that he had scored in an appearance for the reserve team towards the end of October 2011.

Tampa Bay Rowdies
On 10 August 2012, Tampa Bay Rowdies announced they had signed Cort.

Personal life
He is the elder brother of fellow professional footballer Leon Cort, and the younger brother of non-League footballer Wayne Cort. He is also the half-brother of Chelsea midfielder Ruben Loftus-Cheek.

Career statistics

Club

References

External links

1977 births
Footballers from Southwark
Living people
Association football forwards
Black British sportsmen
English footballers
England under-21 international footballers
England youth international footballers
English expatriate footballers
English people of Guyanese descent
Expatriate footballers in Spain
Guyanese footballers
Guyana international footballers
Wimbledon F.C. players
Lincoln City F.C. players
Newcastle United F.C. players
Wolverhampton Wanderers F.C. players
Leicester City F.C. players
Norwich City F.C. players
Brentford F.C. players
Marbella FC players
Tampa Bay Rowdies players
Premier League players
English Football League players
North American Soccer League players
Expatriate soccer players in the United States
People educated at Archbishop Tenison's Church of England School, Lambeth
English expatriate sportspeople in the United States